Release in 2001, Al Quds Tunadeena is the second album by Ahmed Bukhatir. One of the nasheeds in this album, Zayid Al Wafa, is dedicated to the Founder and late President of the United Arab Emirates, Sheikh Zayed bin Sultan Al Nahyan.

Track listing

Notes and references

External links
أحمد بوخاطر Official Website

Ahmed Bukhatir albums
2001 albums